Charles Francis Jenkins (17 December 1865 – 1951) was an American Quaker and historian.

Early life
Jenkins was born in Norristown, Pennsylvania, on 17 December 1865. He lived in Wilmington, Delaware, and West Chester, Pennsylvania, where he completed his basic education. He did not attend college.

Career
Jenkins's early career was at the Farm Journal, which had been founded by his uncle Wilmer Atkinson.

He was a member and president of the Buck Hill Falls Company for fifty years, and a member and president of the Board of Managers of Swarthmore College for forty years.

He was a noted horticulturist who collected hemlocks and created the Hemlock Arboretum at his home in Germantown and campaigned to have the plant selected as the state tree of Pennsylvania.

Death and legacy
Jenkins died in 1951.

Selected publications
 Quaker Poems; A Collection of Verse Relating to the Society of Friends. John C. Winston, Philadelphia, 1893.
 The Guide Book to Historic Germantown. Germantown, 1902.
 Washington in Germantown; Being an account of the various visits of the commander-in-chief and first president to Germantown, Pennsylvania. William J. Campbell, Philadelphia, 1905.
 Jefferson's Germantown Letters, Together with other papers relating to his stay in Germantown during the month of November, 1793. William J. Campbell, Philadelphia, 1906.
 Lafayette's visit to Germantown, July 20, 1825. William J. Campbell, Philadelphia, 1911.
 Tortola: A Quaker Experiment of Long Ago in the Tropics. 1923.

References 

1865 births
1951 deaths
Historians of Quakerism
American Quakers
People from Norristown, Pennsylvania
American horticulturists